Christopher Rocchia (born 1 February 1998) is a French professional footballer who plays as a left-back for Ligue 2 club Dijon.

Club career

Marseille
Rocchia made his professional debut on 29 November 2018 in the UEFA Europa League Group Stage against Eintracht Frankfurt. He replaced Bouna Sarr after 80 minutes in a 4–0 away loss.

Sochaux (loan)
He was loaned to Sochaux in January 2019 until the end of the season. Upon his return to Marseille, he failed to establish himself in the first squad, and on 2 September 2019 he returned to Sochaux for another loan.

Dijon
On 15 June 2021, he moved to Dijon as a free agent on a two-year contract.

Personal life
Born in France, Rocchia is of Comorian and Malagasy descent.

Career statistics

Club

1Includes Coupe de France.
2Includes UEFA Europa League.

References

External links
Marseille profile

1998 births
Living people
Footballers from Marseille
French footballers
French sportspeople of Comorian descent
Olympique de Marseille players
FC Sochaux-Montbéliard players
Dijon FCO players
Ligue 1 players
Ligue 2 players
Association football defenders